Jane Stewart, Countess of Galloway (1 September 1774 – 30 June 1842), formerly Lady Jane Paget, was the wife of George Stewart, 8th Earl of Galloway.

She was the daughter of Henry Paget, 1st Earl of Uxbridge, and sister of Henry Paget, 1st Marquess of Anglesey, and his wife, the former Jane Champagné.

She married Stewart on 18 April 1797.

They had eight children, three of whom died in infancy:
Lady Jane Stewart (1798–1844), who married her first cousin, George Spencer-Churchill, 6th Duke of Marlborough, and had children
Lady Caroline Stewart (1799–1857)
Randolph Stewart, 9th Earl of Galloway (1800–1873)
Lady Louisa Stewart (1804–1889), who married William Duncombe, 2nd Baron Feversham, and had children
Hon Arthur Stewart (1805–1806)
Hon Alan Stewart (1807–1808)
Lady Helen Stewart (1810–1813)
Vice Admiral Hon Keith Stewart (1814–1879), who married Mary FitzRoy, daughter of Charles Augustus FitzRoy, and had children

The earl died in 1834 and his wife became known as Dowager Countess of Galloway. She died at Rutland Gate, Hyde Park, London, aged 67.

References

1774 births
1842 deaths
Scottish countesses
Daughters of British earls